Richard Brock (born 1938) worked in the BBC as a natural history film producer for 35 years. He was a member of the production team on the highly successful Life on Earth, and served as executive producer on The Living Planet, collaborating with David Attenborough. Concerned by the lack of willingness to address the real current state of the environment he left the BBC and started his own independent production company, Living Planet Productions, that has made over 100 films on a wide range of environmental topics.

He decided to set up the Brock Initiative which is undertaking a number of pilot projects in different countries. Aside from making a real difference in these areas the Brock Initiative hopes to encourage and assist others, both film-makers and those who can use film in their work, to do the same. It invites others to follow suit, to learn from our mistakes and success, to donate footage to us, to ask for footage from us; getting it to those who will really benefit from it. Using footage for a production for one village in Tanzania is not going to affect the commercial use of that footage, and can only improve people's image, in a world increasingly aware about global responsibility.

"The very business that made such a success of the subject, surely, should now put something (I suggest a lot) back. It can't afford not to, and they can afford to do it. And it would improve certain people's image." Film is a powerful medium. In the right place and in the right way, film can be positive and effective conservation tool, instigating real change. This is something anyone can do, and many people should be doing. It doesn't cost the world, but will go a long way to saving it. "Not only must wildlife TV catch up, be realistic, it must also put a lot back with the very skills and footage that earned its success in the first place."

He lives in Chew Magna, Somerset.

References

External links 
Brock Initiative
Wildlife-film.com

Living people
English film producers
1938 births